Tommaso Chelli (born 24 September 1995) is an Italian sports shooter. He competed in the men's 25 metre rapid fire pistol event at the 2020 Summer Olympics.

References

External links
 

1995 births
Living people
Italian male sport shooters
Olympic shooters of Italy
Shooters at the 2020 Summer Olympics
Sportspeople from Livorno